Rotorcraft manufacturers fall into two categories:
 those that can design, certify and manufacture new designs from scratch and
 those that can only manufacture extant designs under license.

Boeing Vertol is an example of the first type and Kawasaki Heavy Industries, who license-produced Boeing Vertol designs for much of its recent history, is an example of the second.

Argentina
 AeroDreams
 Chincul
 Cicaré
 FAdeA
 Pateras-Pescara
 RACA S.A.

Australia
 Australian Aerospace – a wholly owned subsidiary of Eurocopter

Belgium
 Dynali Helicopter Company – light helicopter manufacturer

Bosnia and Herzegovina
 SOKO – no longer produces aircraft

Brazil
 Baumgartl
 Instituto de Pesquisa e Desenvolvimento
 Helibras – now a wholly owned subsidiary of Eurocopter

Canada
 Airbus Helicopters Canada (previously Eurocopter Canada)
 Avian Aircraft
 Bell Helicopter – all of Bell Helicopter's commercial rotorcraft are produced at their plant in Mirabel, Quebec.
 CHR International
 Safari Helicopter – kit manufacturer

China
 Changhe Aircraft Industries Corporation
 Harbin Aircraft Manufacturing Corporation
 Hongdu Aviation Industry Group
 Qingdao Haili Helicopters
 Red Eagle Aircraft Manufacturing Co., Ltd.
 Sichuan Lantian Helicopter Company Limited

Czech Republic
 Aero Vodochody
 Moravan

Egypt
 Arab British Helicopter Company – no longer producers of helicopters

France
 Aérospatiale – now part of Eurocopter
 Breguet Aviation
 Citroën – development and flight tests only
 Etablissements Charles Dechaux
 Gaucher Remicopter
 Helicopteres Guimbal
 Nord Aviation – in 1970, merged with Sud Aviation to create Société Nationale d'Industrie Aérospatiale (SNIAS), later renamed Aérospatiale and ultimately merged into European aerospace corporation EADS in 2000
 Sud Aviation – became part of Aérospatiale, now part of Airbus Helicopters (formerly Eurocopter Group)

Germany
 Bölkow – merged with Messerschmitt AG to become Messerschmitt-Bölkow and later Messerschmitt-Bölkow-Blohm
 Dornier Flugzeugwerke – no longer produces aircraft 
 Flettner – no longer in business
 Focke-Achgelis – no longer in business
 Messerschmitt-Bölkow-Blohm – became part of Airbus Helicopter
 Youngcopter – develops a kit helicopter

India
 Hindustan Aeronautics Limited
 Mahindra Aerospace
 Tata Advanced Systems
 National Aerospace Laboratories

Indonesia
 Indonesian Aerospace – formerly known as Industri Pesawat Terbang Nusantara (IPTN) or Industri Pesawat Terbang Nurtanio (IPTN)

Iran
 HESA
 Panha
 ZAFAR

Italy
 Aero Eli Servizi Costruzioni Aeronautiche
 AgustaWestland
 Elicotteri Meridionali – now called the Sesto Calende (VA) facility of Agusta
 Alpi Aviation
 DF Helicopters Srl
 Fiat – in 1969, Fiat Aviazione merged with Aerfer to create Aeritalia
 Heli-Sport
 Konner Srl
 Partenavia – declared bankruptcy and Vulcanair bought all the assets, design rights and trademarks
 Piaggio Aero
 Silvercraft – went out of business in the late 1970s

Japan
 Fuji Heavy Industries
 GEN Corporation
 Kawasaki Aerospace Company
 Mitsubishi Heavy Industries

Korea (ROK)
 Korea Aerospace Industries (aka KAI)

Netherlands
 VFW-Fokker

New Zealand
 Mosquito Aviation

Poland
 PZL-Świdnik WSK – now part of AgustaWestland

Romania
 IAR – the sole Romanian manufacturer of helicopters

Russia
 Bratukhin – a helicopter design bureau dissolved in 1951
 Russian Helicopters (a division of Oboronprom)
 Kamov
 Kazan
 Mil Helicopters
 Rostvertol
 Ulan-Ude Aviation Plant
 Yakovlev – no longer produces helicopters

Serbia
 EDePro – developed a tip jet helicopter

South Africa
 Atlas Aircraft Corporation – became Denel Aviation
 Denel Aviation
 RotorWay South Africa

Spain
 Aerotécnica
 AISA (Aeronáutica Industrial S.A.)  – part of CASA and no longer produces rotorcraft
 ELA Aviación
 Eurocopter España – located in Madrid and Albacete

Switzerland
 Berger-Helicopter (defunct)
 Marenco Swisshelicopter  – founded in 2007
 SKT Helicopter

Taiwan
 AIDC

Turkey

 Turkish Aerospace Industries (aka TAI or TUSAŞ)

Ukraine
 Aerokopter (formerly DB Aercopters)
 Aviaimpex
 Aviakon
 Skyline Construction Bureau
 ViAZ

United Kingdom
Airmaster Helicopters (defunct)
Bristol Aeroplane Company – now part of BAE Systems and no longer produces aircraft
Cierva Autogiro Company (defunct)
Fairey Aviation – aircraft manufacturing arm was taken over by Westland Aircraft in 1960
Firth Helicopters
Gadfly Aircraft (defunct)
Saro – merged with Westland Aircraft, later Agusta-Westland
Thruxton Aviation
Wallis Autogyros
Westland Aircraft – merged with the helicopter divisions of Bristol, Fairey and Saunders-Roe (with their hovercraft) to create Westland Helicopters in 1961
Westland Helicopters – now part of AgustaWestland

United States
 A-B Helicopters
 Aerodyne Systems Engineering (defunct)
 AirScooter Corporation
 American Eurocopter – founded as Vought Helicopter Inc, now a wholly owned subsidiary of Eurocopter
 American Helicopter
 Aviodyne U.S.A.
 Bell/Agusta Aerospace Company
 Bell Helicopter
 Bendix Helicopter Company (defunct)
 Bensen Aircraft Company (defunct)
 Boeing Rotorcraft Systems (formerly Boeing Helicopters & Boeing-Vertol)
 Brantly International – all manufacturing is  done in Qingdao, China
 Campbell Aircraft Company (defunct)
 Carter Aviation Technologies
 Cessna
 Columbia Helicopters
 Curtiss-Wright
 Doman Helicopters
 Enstrom Helicopter Corporation
 Erickson Air-Crane
 Fairchild Aircraft
 FH1100 Manufacturing Corporation
 Glenview Metal Products
 Goodyear
 Gyrodyne Company of America
 Higgins Industries (defunct) – no longer produces aircraft
 Hiller Aircraft
 Hillman Helicopter
 Hughes Aircraft
 Kaman Aircraft
 Lockheed Martin – formerly Lockheed Aircraft
 MD Helicopters – formerly McDonnell Douglas Corp
 Piasecki Aircraft
 Piasecki Helicopter – acquired by Boeing and became Boeing Vertol
 Revolution Helicopter Corporation (defunct) – went out of business in November 1999
 Robinson Helicopter
 RotorWay International – produces kit helicopters
 Sikorsky Aircraft
 Schweizer Aircraft – acquired by Sikorsky Aircraft in 2004 and closed down in 2011 and 2012
 Spitfire Helicopter Company
 Texas Helicopters Co (no longer manufacturers)
 Umbaugh
 Vertical Aviation Technologies
 Vought Helicopter Inc. (VHI) – a subsidiary of Ling-Temco-Vought (LTV); became American Eurocopter
 NASA/JPL for Ingenuity helicopter

International
 Airbus Helicopters – was Eurocopter
 European Helicopter Industries, now AgustaWestland
 NHIndustries

See also
 List of aircraft manufacturers
 List of rotorcraft
 List of tilt-rotor craft

References

Bibliography
Apostolo, Giorgio. The Illustrated Encyclopedia of Helicopters, Bonanza Books, New York, 1984. .

Rotorcraft
Rotorcraft
Rotorcraft